Roger Soler (born 20 September 1960) is a Peruvian long-distance runner. He competed in the men's 5000 metres at the 1984 Summer Olympics. Soler finished eighth in the 10000 metres at the 1987 Pan American Games.

References

1960 births
Living people
Athletes (track and field) at the 1984 Summer Olympics
Peruvian male long-distance runners
Olympic athletes of Peru
Athletes (track and field) at the 1987 Pan American Games
Pan American Games competitors for Peru
Place of birth missing (living people)
20th-century Peruvian people